The 1745 English cricket season was the second season following the earliest known codification of the Laws of Cricket.

Recorded matches 
Details of 22 eleven-a-side matches between significant teams have survived:

6 May – London v Addington – Kennington Common
23 May – Addington v London – Addington Hills
24 May – Bromley v London – Bromley Common
27 May – London v Addington – Artillery Ground
10 June – London v Bromley – Artillery Ground
17 June – London v Bromley – Artillery Ground
26 June – Long Robin's XI v Richard Newland's XI – Artillery Ground
5 July – Long Robin's XI v Richard Newland's XI – Artillery Ground
12 July – Kent v England – Bromley Common
13 July – Trial Match – Artillery Ground
15 July – England v Kent – Artillery Ground
22 July – Addington & Lingfield v Surrey – Artillery Ground
23 July – Croydon v Lambeth – Kennington Common
24 July – Kingston v Lambeth – Kennington Common
3 August – Addington v Lingfield – Addington Hills
7 August – London v Kingston – Artillery Ground
12 August – London v Addington – Artillery Ground
19 August – Surrey v Sussex – Artillery Ground
21 August – Surrey v Sussex – Moulsey Hurst
26 August – Sussex v Surrey – Bury Hill, Arundel
16 September – Addington & Lingfield v Surrey – Artillery Ground
28 September –  Hills of Kent v Dales of Kent – Artillery Ground

Single wicket matches
A single wicket match between two teams of three took place on 24 June at the Artillery Ground.

Other events
On 10 May, the Ipswich Journal reported that: "All lovers of Cricket are hereby desired to meet at Gray's Coffee House (in Norwich) on Friday 17th inst. at 6 pm to settle rules for that manly diversion". The report is the earliest known mention of cricket in the county of Norfolk.

A ladies match took place on Gosden Common, near Guildford, between "XI Maids of Bramley" and "XI Maids of Hambledon" on 26 July. The players dressed in white but the Hambledon team wore red ribbons on their heads and the Bramley team wore blue ribbons. A return match was played on 6 August.

First mentions

Counties
 Norfolk

Clubs and teams
 Dales of Kent
 Hills of Kent
 Lambeth
 William Hodsoll's XI

Players
 Robert Lascoe
 Jacob Mann

Venues
 Addington Hills

References

Bibliography

Further reading
 
 
 
 

1745 in English cricket
English cricket seasons in the 18th century